Sergey Vabishchevich (born 15 March 1993) is a Belarusian former professional footballer.

External links 
 
 

1993 births
Living people
Belarusian footballers
Association football midfielders
FC Dynamo Brest players